The Warburton Baronetcy, of Arley in the County of Chester, was a title in the Baronetage of England. It was created on 27 June 1660 by Charles II for George Warburton, of Arley Hall, Cheshire, whose great-uncle had been Sergeant at Law and a Justice of Common Pleas  in the time of Charles I. The Warburton family removed from Warburton, Cheshire to Arley in the 14th century. The third Baronet was a Knight of the Shire for Cheshire. The title became extinct on the death of the fifth Baronet in 1813. The Cheshire estates passed into the Egerton-Warburton family and then to Viscount Ashbrook.

Warburton baronets, of Arley (1660)
 Sir George Warburton, 1st Baronet (1622–1676)
 Sir Peter Warburton, 2nd Baronet (died 1698)
Sir George Warburton, 3rd Baronet (1675–1743)
 Sir Peter Warburton, 4th Baronet (1708–1774)
 Sir Peter Warburton, 5th Baronet (1754–1813)

References 
  The Baronetage of England Containing a Genealogical and Historical Account of all the Baronets now existing Volume 2, Edward Kimber and Richard Johnson (1771), p. 53, Google Books
 

Extinct baronetcies in the Baronetage of England